Rose Volante (born 12 August 1982) is a Brazilian professional boxer who held the WBO female lightweight title from 2017 to 2019.

Professional career
Volante won the vacant WBO female lightweight title on 22 December 2017, with a majority decision win over Brenda Karen Carabajal. She retained the title against Lourdes Borbua and Yolis Marrugo Franco before losing it to IBF and WBA champion Katie Taylor in a unification bout on March 15, 2019.

Professional boxing record

References

External links

1982 births
Living people
Brazilian women boxers
World lightweight boxing champions
World Boxing Organization champions
Sportspeople from São Paulo